Raul A. Cano (born December 23, 1945) is a Mexican former professional baseball manager and pitcher. Born in Guaymas, Sonora, he batted and threw right handed.

Though he never played in or managed in the Major Leagues, Cano spent a long career in the Mexican League, the highest level of professional baseball in Mexico.

Canó played in Minor league baseball from 1967 to 1971, mostly with the Diablos Rojos del México. He later managed the Venados de Mazatlán to the 1997–1998 Mexican Pacific League championship.  As the league champions, the team represented Mexico in the 1998 Caribbean Series.

Besides, he has managed in the Mexican League for the Ángeles de Puebla (1973; 1977–1978), Plataneros de Tabasco (1979; 1982), Rojos del Águila de Veracruz (1995; 1999), Petroleros de Poza Rica (1996), Mayas de Chetumal (1998), Algodoneros de Torreón (2000), Broncos de Reynosa (2001–2002), Saraperos de Saltillo (2003), Potros de Tijuana (2005) and Olmecas de Tabasco (2011–2012).

Sources
Treto Cisneros, Pedro (2002). The Mexican League/La Liga Mexicana: Comprehensive Player Statistics, 1937-2001. McFarland & Company. 
Mexican League pitching statistics

References

1945 births
Living people
Baseball players from Sonora
Caribbean Series managers
Diablos Rojos de Las Choapas players
Diablos Rojos del México players
Mexican League baseball managers
Mexican League baseball pitchers
People from Guaymas